Katherine "Katie" A. Boehret (born 1980) works in internal communications for the Devices team at Amazon, an e-commerce and cloud-computing firm.

Biography
A native of Allentown, Pennsylvania, Katie Boehret is a graduate of the University of Delaware. In 2010, she was awarded that university's Presidential Citation for Outstanding Achievement.

From 2002 through 2013, Boehret was a journalist and columnist at The Wall Street Journal, where she worked with technology columnist Walter Mossberg. Boehret authored "The Digital Solution" column, which appeared weekly in the newspaper and online.

She was also a columnist and editor at the technology web sites All Things Digital and Recode, where she was deputy reviews editor and senior reviewer. She was an original staff member of both sites and also of the D Conference. After Recode was sold to Vox Media in June 2015, Boehret served as a reviews editor at The Verge, until July 2016.

References

External links
Katherine Boehret at All Things Digital

1980 births
Living people
21st-century American women
All Things Digital people
American women journalists
Journalists from Pennsylvania
The Wall Street Journal people
University of Delaware alumni
Writers from Allentown, Pennsylvania